Miyela Afrika is Vusi Mahlasela's fourth studio album.

Track listing
 "The Earth I Know is a Woman"
 "Ingoma"
 "Mme Motswadi"
 "Miyela Afrika"
 "A Proud People"
 "Will You Have Time?"
 "Amdokwe"
 "Sipho Sami"
 "Afrika Borwa"
 "Ntate Mohapi"
 "A Prayer for Our Time"
 "Mama Bombay"
 "Khelo Kha Magheshe"
 "Emtini Wababe"
 "Tsi Tsi"

Vusi Mahlasela albums
2000 albums